Dragan Kovačić (5 October 1939 – 11 February 1999) was a Yugoslav-Croatian basketball player. He competed in the men's tournament at the 1964 Summer Olympics.

References

External links
 

1939 births
1999 deaths
Croatian men's basketball players
Olympic basketball players of Yugoslavia
Basketball players at the 1964 Summer Olympics
Yugoslav men's basketball players
1963 FIBA World Championship players
1967 FIBA World Championship players